Chauncey is a city in Dodge County, Georgia, United States. The population was 289 at the 2020 census. It was formed around station number twelve on the Macon and Brunswick Railroad.

History
The Georgia General Assembly incorporated the "Town of Chauncey" in 1883. The community was named after William Chauncey, a businessperson in the local lumber industry.

Geography

Chauncey is located in southeastern Dodge County at  (32.104972, -83.065991). U.S. Routes 23 and 341 pass concurrently through the center of town, leading northwest  to Eastman, the county seat, and east  to McRae. Sugar Creek runs along the southwest border of the city.

Demographics

2020 census

As of the 2020 United States census, there were 289 people, 143 households, and 89 families residing in the city.

2000 census
As of the census of 2000, there were 295 people, 111 households, and 85 families residing in the town. The racial makeup of the town was 58.98% White, 39.32% African American and 1.69% Native American. Hispanic or Latino of any race were 0.34% of the population.

There were 111 households, out of which 36.9% had children under the age of 18 living with them, 50.5% were married couples living together, 23.4% had a female householder with no husband present, and 23.4% were non-families. 22.5% of all households were made up of individuals, and 9.0% had someone living alone who was 65 years of age or older.  The average household size was 2.66 and the average family size was 3.13.

In the town the population was spread out, with 29.8% under the age of 18, 7.1% from 18 to 24, 24.4% from 25 to 44, 24.7% from 45 to 64, and 13.9% who were 65 years of age or older.  The median age was 36 years. For every 100 females, there were 102.1 males.  For every 100 females age 18 and over, there were 81.6 males.

The median income for a household in the town was $26,818, and the median income for a family was $29,500. Males had a median income of $22,813 versus $20,625 for females. The per capita income for the town was $12,600.  About 17.5% of families and 17.8% of the population were below the poverty line, including 21.4% of those under the age of eighteen and 15.6% of those 65 or over.

References

Cities in Dodge County, Georgia
Cities in Georgia (U.S. state)